Mountaineer Middle School may refer to:

 A school in Clarksburg, West Virginia, see Harrison County Schools#Middle schools
 A school in Morgantown, West Virginia, see Morgantown, West Virginia#Education